Shindig! is an American musical variety series which aired on ABC from September 16, 1964 to January 8, 1966. The show was hosted by Jimmy O'Neill, a disc jockey in Los Angeles, who also created the show along with his wife Sharon Sheeley, British producer Jack Good, and production executive Art Stolnitz. The original pilot was rejected by ABC and David Sontag, then executive producer of ABC, redeveloped and completely redesigned the show. A new pilot with a new cast of artists was shot starring Sam Cooke. That pilot aired as the premiere episode.

Synopsis

Shindig! was conceived as a short-notice replacement for Hootenanny, a series that had specialized in folk revival music. The folk revival had fizzled in 1964 as the result of the British Invasion, which damaged the ratings for Hootenanny and prompted that show's cancellation.

Shindig! focused on a broader variety of popular music than its predecessor and first aired for a half-hour every Wednesday evening, but was expanded to an hour in January 1965. In the fall of 1965, the show split into two half-hour telecasts, on Thursday and Saturday nights.

Shindig!'''s premiere episode was actually the second pilot, and featured Sam Cooke, The Everly Brothers, and The Righteous Brothers. Later shows featured performances that were taped in Britain - A set was used at Twickenham Film Studios, where British acts performed live for the cameras, with the resultant footage flown back to be shown on the program. The first UK episode had The Beatles as the guests. The series later featured other "British invasion" bands and performers including The Who, The Rolling Stones, and Cilla Black. Shindig! continued to broadcast episodes with footage shot in London throughout its run. This meant many acts were seen on U.S television before they actually went to America (The Who in particular, who performed a unique early version of 'My Generation' live, two months before the single version was recorded).

Many other popular performers of the day played on Shindig! including Tina Turner, Lesley Gore, Bo Diddley, Sonny and Cher, The Beach Boys, James Brown, Jackie Wilson, The Supremes, and The Ronettes.Shindig!'s success prompted NBC to air the similar series Hullabaloo starting in January 1965 and other producers to launch syndicated rock music shows like Shivaree and Hollywood a Go-Go.In March 1965, Little Eva performed a live but short version of her hit song "The Loco-Motion". This is the only known video clip of her singing it.

Toward the end of the program's run, The Mamas and the Papas appeared in an episode featuring Barry McGuire. Although serving as his backup singers, the group introduced "California Dreamin'" on that program, which launched its career.Shindig! is one of the few rock music shows of the era to still have all of the episodes available to watch.

Final season
In September 1965, the show was moved out of its Wednesday-night time slot (where it gave The Beverly Hillbillies its first serious competition in its time period among younger viewers), and split into two half-hours on new days and times (Thursdays and Saturdays at 7:30 P.M. Eastern time). The show faced tough competition from Daniel Boone and The Munsters on Thursdays along with Flipper and The Jackie Gleason Show on Saturdays. Additionally, the Saturday edition aired in a time period when many of its potential viewers were going out and, thus, not at home to watch television. By October 1965, the show was having ratings problems (Time magazine said "early-season tide [was] running against the teen scene"), and in January 1966, Shindig! was cancelled and replaced in its Thursday time slots by Batman.Series regularsShindig! also featured a dance troupe choreographed by David Winters and André Tayir, who accompanied the music acts of the week (Winters later worked on the competing NBC show Hullabaloo). One of the regular dancers was Teri Garr, who went on to find success as an actress. Others included Maria Gahva, Lorene Yarnell (later of the mime team Shields and Yarnell) Diane Stuart, Pam Freeman, Gina Trikinis, Marianna Picora, Virginia Justus, Rini Jarmon and Carol Shelyne, who always wore glasses while she danced.  Occasionally, a small group of dancers who sang would get a featured spot; this rotating group was billed as The Shindig Girls.  The assistant choreographer was Antonia Basilotta, better known as Toni Basil, who later gained fame with her 1980s hit song "Mickey". Both Garr and Basil were dance students of David Winters at the time and worked with him on most of his choreography projects.

The series house band was supposedly known as "The Shin-diggers", but that was actually the name host Jimmy O'Neill used to refer to fans of the show.  At first, TV credits identified the musicians simply as the Shindig Band.  By early 1965, they'd been renamed Sir Rufus Marion Banks and his Band of Men, but the generic name had returned by the time "Shindig" went off the air.  The rhythm section was spun off into a featured group and named the Shindogs.  It included Joey Cooper on bass, Chuck Blackwell on drums, James Burton on lead guitar, Delaney Bramlett on rhythm guitar and Glen D. Hardin on keyboards.  Cooper and Bramlett traded off lead vocal duties.  The larger band featured Jerry Cole on lead guitar, Russ Titelman on rhythm guitar, Larry Knechtel on bass, Leon Russell on piano, Julius Wechter on percussion and Ritchie Frost on drums.  Later, Billy Preston took over keyboards and performed as a singing regular.  Glen Campbell was not a regular member of this band but a frequent guest performer.  Ray Pohlman was the musical director, and he was also one - as was Campbell, Knechtel, Wechter and Russell - of the collection of first-call pop studio musicians that would later be known as "The Wrecking Crew". In some instances when one of the guitarists was unable to work, Pohlman would bring in Bill Aken to fill in.

The Righteous Brothers, Dick and Dee Dee, Jackie and Gayle, Donna Loren, Willy Nelson (not the famous Country singer Willie Nelson) and Bobby Sherman were regular vocalists on the series.  Up until July 1965, when he quit the show, producer Jack Good was also a regular, wearing a bowler hat and improvising comedy routines with Jimmy O'Neill at the close of each episode.

The Blossoms, an all-female vocal group featuring Darlene Love, backed up many of the performers and were occasionally featured in spotlight performances. The Wellingtons were a trio of male singers who performed on their own, and as backup singers.  Another male group, The Eligibles, sometimes alternated with The Wellingtons on backup.

Musical guests

 Terry Allen
The Animals
Louis Armstrong
Desi Arnaz, Jr.
Long John Baldry
The Barron Knights
Fontella Bass
Shirley Bassey
The Beach Boys
The Beatles
James Brown
The Byrds
The Beau Brummels
Tony Bennett
The Chambers Brothers
Chuck Berry
Cilla Black
Booker T & the MG's
Vashti Bunyan
Glen Campbell
Freddy Cannon
Johnny Cash
Chad and Jeremy
Ray Charles
Chubby Checker
The Clara Ward Singers
Petula Clark
The Coasters
Sam Cooke
The Dave Clark Five
Karl Denver
Jackie DeShannon
Dick & Dee Dee
Dino, Desi & Billy
Bo Diddley
The Dixie Cups
Donovan
The Everly Brothers
Shelley Fabares
Adam Faith
Marianne Faithfull
The Four Tops
Aretha Franklin
Freddie and the Dreamers
Billy Fury
Gale Garnett
Gary Lewis & the Playboys
Marvin Gaye
The Gentrys
Gerry & the Pacemakers
Stan Getz
Dizzy Gillespie
Dobie Gray
Bessie Griffin
Bobby Goldsboro
Lesley Gore
The Grass Roots
Ruben Guevara (credited as "J.P. Mobey")
Françoise Hardy
Herman's Hermits
The Hollies
Don Ho
Brenda Holloway
The Honeycombs
The Ikettes
The Isley Brothers
Davy Jones
Gloria Jones
The Kingsmen
The Kinks
Billy J. Kramer & the Dakotas
Bettye LaVette
Major Lance
Dinah Lee
Ketty Lester
Jerry Lee Lewis
Little Anthony and the Imperials
Little Eva
Little Richard
The Lovin' Spoonful
Lulu & the Luvvers
George Maharis
The Mamas & the Papas
Manfred Mann
Martha & the Vandellas
Melinda Marx
Johnny Mathis
Jody Miller
Sal Mineo
Matt Monro
The Moody Blues
The Nashville Teens
Ricky Nelson
The Nooney Rickett 4
The Olympics
Roy Orbison
Rita Pavone
Peter and Gordon
Gene Pitney
The Poets
The Pretty Things
P. J. Proby
Eddie Rambeau
Roy Head
Johnny Rivers
Smokey Robinson and The Miracles
Jimmie Rodgers
The Rolling Stones
The Ronettes
Mickey Rooney, Jr.
Bobby Rydell
Tommy Sands
Neil Sedaka
Del Shannon
Dee Dee Sharp
Sandie Shaw
The Shangri-Las
Sir Douglas Quintet
Sonny & Cher
George Soulé
The Spencer Davis Group
Rod Stewart (as part of Brian Auger and the Trinity)
The Supremes
The Temptations
Joe Tex
Tommy Tucker
Ike & Tina Turner
The Turtles
Twinkle
Unit 4 + 2
Leroy Van Dyke
Sylvie Vartan
Bobby Vee
The Ventures
The Vibrations
The Walker Brothers
We Five
Clara Ward Singers
Mary Wells
The Who
Hank Williams, Jr.
Joe Williams
Jackie Wilson
Howlin' Wolf
The Yardbirds
The Zombies

Celebrity guests
Ted Cassidy as Lurch in Halloween episode 
Patty Duke
Douglas Fairbanks, Jr.
Rosey Grier
Tommy Kirk
Vincent Price
Alan Sues
Raquel Welch
Orson Welles

Guest hosts
George Chakiris
Zsa Zsa Gabor
Carolyn Jones
Boris Karloff in Halloween episode 
Hedy Lamarr
Jack E. Leonard
Hugh O'Brian
Mickey Rooney
Ed Wynn

VHS release
In 1991 and 1992, Rhino Entertainment and WEA released a series of Shindig! Presents VHS videos featuring highlights from the series.

In popular cultureShindig! was mentioned in The Ramones song "Do You Remember Rock 'n' Roll Radio?" in the lyric "Do you remember Hullabaloo, Upbeat, Shindig!, and Ed Sullivan too...?"Shindig! made an appearance on a December 1965 episode of The Flintstones as "Shinrock!" with host "Jimmy O'Neillstone" (O'Neill provided his own voice). The episode featured musical guests The Beau Brummels, appearing as "The Beau Brummelstones", who performed their hit song "Laugh, Laugh". Fred turns off the show, saying "Let me take care of Jimmy O'Neillstone," whereupon O'Neillstone's hand reaches out from the set and turns it back on. "Well," Barney quips, "that's one way of keeping up their ratings."The Shindogs were a rock group parody on an episode of The Patty Duke Show'' ("Partying Is Such Sweet Sorrow", Sept. 29, 1965), when Patty sang, "Funny Little Butterflies."

References

External links
 

1964 American television series debuts
1966 American television series endings
American Broadcasting Company original programming
1960s American music television series
1960s American variety television series
Black-and-white American television shows
English-language television shows
Pop music television series
Television series by Selmur Productions